Microbacterium awajiense is a Gram-positive and non-motile bacterium from the genus Microbacterium which has been isolated from sand sediments from the Awaji Island on Japan.

References

Further reading

External links
Type strain of Microbacterium awajiense at BacDive -  the Bacterial Diversity Metadatabase	

Bacteria described in 2008
awajiense